Instituto Mayor Campesino (IMCA) was founded by the Jesuits in Buga, Colombia, in 1962 to be of service to rural villagers. It has undertaken a wide variety of works over time for the integral development of workers and peasants.

Activities
IMCA is currently involved in:
 Production and commercialization
 Organization
 Training
 Pastoral assistance
 Publishing
 Networking

References  

1962 establishments in Colombia
Jesuit development centres
Organizations established in 1962
Poverty-related organizations
Non-profit organisations based in Colombia